Chitturi Satyanarayana (6 October 1913 – 19 April 2012) was an eminent Indian ENT surgeon who served in the post of Honorary Surgeon to the President of India.

References

Indian surgeons
1913 births
2012 deaths
20th-century Indian medical doctors
20th-century surgeons